Miguel Alejandro Vargas Soto (born 15 May 1969) is a Chilean former footballer who played as a midfielder for clubs in Chile and Greece.

Club career
A product of Colo-Colo youth system, Vargas took part of the first team thanks to the coach Arturo Salah and made five appearances in 1988 in the league, as well as in the Copa Libertadores. He also was with them in the 1995 season. In both the 1987 and 1989 seasons, he played on loan at Rangers de Talca.

In the Chilean Primera División, he also played for Deportes Antofagasta (1992), Coquimbo Unido (1994), Unión Española (1996) and Palestino.

In the Chilean Segunda División, he played for Audax Italiano (1991) and Magallanes (1993).

Abroad, he played for OFI Crete in the Alpha Ethniki from 1998 to 2000, becoming the third Chilean to play for the club after Alejandro Hisis and Jaime Vera.

Coaching career
He began his career as coach at the Colo-Colo academies and works for the Colo-Colo youth system since 2019.

References

External links
 
 
 Miguel Vargas at Mi.CSDColo-Colo.cl 
 

1969 births
Living people
Footballers from Santiago
Chilean footballers
Chilean expatriate footballers
Chilean Primera División players
Colo-Colo footballers
Rangers de Talca footballers
C.D. Antofagasta footballers
Coquimbo Unido footballers
Unión Española footballers
Club Deportivo Palestino footballers
Primera B de Chile players
Audax Italiano footballers
Deportes Magallanes footballers
Magallanes footballers
Super League Greece players
OFI Crete F.C. players
Chilean expatriate sportspeople in Greece
Expatriate footballers in Greece
Association football midfielders
Chilean football managers